The 2012–13 León season was the 66th professional season of Mexico's top-flight football league. The season is split into two tournaments—the Torneo Apertura and the Torneo Clausura—each with identical formats and each contested by the same eighteen teams. Tijuana began their season on July 21, 2012 against Querétaro, León played their most home games on Saturday at 8:06pm local time. This was León first season in Mexican top-flight league since the Verano 2002 after defeating Correcaminos UAT in the promotion final. León qualified third to the final phase and was eliminated by Tijuana in the semi-finals, León did not qualify to the final phase in the Clausura tournament.

Torneo Apertura

Squad

Regular season

Apertura 2012 results

Final phase

León advanced 4–2 on aggregate

Tijuana advanced 3–2 on aggregate

Goalscorers

Regular season

Source:

Final phase

Results

Results summary

Results by round

Copa MX

Group stage

Apertura results

Goalscorers

Results

Results by round

Torneo Clausura

Squad

Regular season

Clausura 2013 results

León did not qualify to the Final Phase

Goalscorers

Results

Results summary

Results by round

Copa Libertadores

First stage

Iquique advanced on penalties.

Goalscorers

References

Club León
Mexican football clubs 2012–13 season